Mage Parab (or Mage Porob) is the principal festival celebrated among the Ho people of eastern India, and is also celebrated by the Munda people. It is not celebrated by any other Munda-speaking peoples like Juang, Gadab and is much less prominent to the Mundas than to the Hos. It is held in the month of Mage ponai in honor of the deity Singbonga who, in the Ho creation myth, created Luku Kola, the first man on Earth. It was first described in 1912 by Indian anthropologist Rai Bahadur Sarat Chandra Roy in his The Mundas and their Country.

References

Religious festivals in India
Festivals in Odisha
Culture of Jharkhand
February observances
Annual events in India
Religion in Jharkhand